Professor Deepak Malghan is an Indian ecological economist, social activist and author. He advocates for business ethics and transparency at work and against environmental degradation. He is professor in public policy  at Indian Institute of Management, Bangalore. He is an adjunct professor at Ashoka Trust for Ecology & Environment. He started a protest movement against Hindustan Unilever for poor environment protection.

Early life
Prof. Malghan was born in Liverpool, UK. His father Dr. Vaman Malghan was an Indian electrical engineer with a PhD from SUNY, Buffalo. Deepak Malghan obtained the degree of Doctor of Philosophy from University of Maryland in 2006 for his dissertation titled On Being the Right Size : A framework for the analytical study of Scale, Economy and Ecosystem under the guidance of Prof.Herman Daly. Early research focused on human appropriation of the product of photosynthesis and ecological footprint of economic development.  Other areas of interest include urban hydrology and social hydrology.

Activism
Malghan-led activists protested environmental degradation by a thermometer factory in Kodaikanal run by Hindustan Unilever. They accused the company of dumping mercury in inhabited areas instead of dealing with it as per international norms. Hindustan Unilever admitted its guilt in 2010. Subsequently, Malghan wrote a letter to IIM students urging them to dis-invite Hindustan Unilever during campus placement, which created controversy.

Polemic against Elitism
Malghan has claimed that social diversity at a workplace can improve accountability and transparency. He accused India's premier business schools of becoming elitist, and not having adequate representation from the underprivileged strata of society. He demanded drastic changes in human resources policies at top management institutes, stating that these institutes have been misusing their autonomy for self aggrandizement. He protested against the extra income paid to IIM professors for official work such as conducting admission interviews. He made several RTI queries to obtain the pay details of top IIM officials.

Censure at workplace
IIM Bangalore issued a censure order to him, directing him to retract his e-mails sent to students. Malghan retracted his statement under protest. His fellow faculty members objected to his activities, saying it would hamper campus placement at management institutes.

See also
Indian Institute of Management Bangalore
Hindustan Unilever

References

Living people
1973 births
Indian economists